The Circle of Rhine Party was a political party in Switzerland led by Josef Jäger.

History
The party was established in 1905 as a breakaway from the Free Democratic Party in Aargau. In the 1908 federal elections it put forward two candidates in Aargau-Nord, Jäger and Arnold Doser, but failed to win a seat. In the 1911 federal elections it ran three candidates in Aargau-Nord, winning one seat, taken by Jäger. The following year it merged back into the FDP.

References

Defunct political parties in Switzerland
1905 establishments in Switzerland
Political parties established in 1905
1912 disestablishments in Switzerland
Political parties disestablished in 1912